Volodymyr Ivanovych Sterlyk (born 15 October 1940) is a retired Ukrainian rower. He competed for the Soviet Union at the 1964, 1968 and 1972 Summer Olympics and finished in fifth, third and fourth place in the eights, eights and coxed fours events, respectively. Between 1963 and 1971 he won two gold, four silver and one bronze medals at European and world championships.

References

1940 births
Living people
Sportspeople from Poltava
Ukrainian male rowers
Soviet male rowers
Olympic rowers of the Soviet Union
Rowers at the 1964 Summer Olympics
Rowers at the 1968 Summer Olympics
Rowers at the 1972 Summer Olympics
Olympic bronze medalists for the Soviet Union
Olympic medalists in rowing
World Rowing Championships medalists for the Soviet Union
Medalists at the 1968 Summer Olympics
Honoured Masters of Sport of the USSR
European Rowing Championships medalists